Strontium phosphide is an inorganic compound of strontium  and phosphorus with the chemical formula . The compound looks like black crystalline material.

Synthesis
Heating strontium phosphate with soot in an arc furnace:

 Sr3(PO4)2 + 8C -> Sr3P2 + 8CO  

Reaction of strontium with red phosphorus at high temperature:
 6Sr + P4 -> 2Sr3P2

Physical properties
Strontium phosphide forms black crystals.

Thermally stable, melts at high temperatures.

Dangerous when wet, poison.

Chemical properties
Decomposes with water releasing phosphine:
 Sr3P2 + 2H2O -> 3Sr(OH)2 + 2PH3

Reacts with acids:
 Sr3P2 + 6HCl -> 3SrCl2 + 2PH3

Uses
It is a highly reactive substance used as a reagent and in the manufacture of chemically reactive devices.

References

Phosphides
Strontium compounds